de Musset's sign is a condition in which there is rhythmic nodding or bobbing of the head in synchrony with the beating of the heart, in general as a result of aortic regurgitation whereby blood from the aorta regurgitates into the left ventricle due to a defect in the aortic valve. The nodding is an indication that the systolic pulse is being felt by the patient because of the increased pulse pressure resulting from the aortic insufficiency. The condition was named after the French poet Alfred de Musset. De Musset's sign is a type of head tremor.

See also
 Aortic aneurysm
 Tremor

References

Cardiovascular diseases
Medical signs